Gabrielius "Gabas" Maldūnas (born 19 April 1993) is a Lithuanian professional basketball player who plays as a center for Lietkabelis Panevėžys of the Lithuanian Basketball League (LKL). He graduated from Dartmouth College in 2015.

Early life and high school
Maldūnas was born in Panevėžys, Lithuania where he went to school and played basketball until 2008. In the summer of 2008 he went to the US to study and play basketball at Holderness School. He played there for three years and each year his team made the NEPSAC playoffs, reaching the finals once. In his senior year of high school, Gabas was the team’s captain, averaging 18 points and 8 rebounds.

College career
Maldūnas had a very successful career at Dartmouth College, appearing in 102 games for the Big Green. He is one of four Ivy League players to ever score 1,000 points, and record over 700 rebounds, 100 assists, 100 blocks and 100 steals.

During his sophomore year Gabas was selected to the All-Ivy second team. He continued playing strong during his junior year, but his season was cut short due to an ACL injury on January 20, 2014.

He came back for his senior year and helped the Big Green achieve their best record since 1998-1999 season. He was selected to the All-Ivy second team for the second time in his career along with his teammate Alex Mitola. Maldunas' game-winning shot in the last game of the season against Yale was on SC Top 10 and it helped the Big Green to get invited to the first post season tournament since 1959. However, they lost to Canisius in the first round of the CIT Tournament.

Gabas finished his Dartmouth career 22nd on the scoring list, 3rd in career blocked shots and 4th in rebounds. He was the first Dartmouth player in 56 years to record 1,000 points and 700 rebounds and only the second ever to record 100 career blocks and 100 steals.

In June 2015 he graduated with an Economics degree and went on to play professional basketball in Europe.

Professional career

CB Peñas Huesca

On 28 August 2015, Maldūnas signed to play in the second-tier league in Spain for CB Peñas Huesca.

During the regular season he averaged 10 points and 6.6 rebounds while helping a very young and inexperienced Peñas team record 16 wins and 14 losses and make the playoffs as the 7th seed.

In the playoffs the Peñas made it all the way to the finals after beating Oviedo CB 3-1 in the first round and CB Miraflores also 3-1 in the semifinals. However, the team lost the final series 3-0 to Club Melilla Baloncesto.

Palencia Baloncesto
On 7 July 2016, Maldūnas signed with the 2016 LEB Oro champions Palencia Baloncesto. He led his team to the finals by scoring 20 points and getting 8 rebounds in the series deciding game against Oviedo CB. The team lost in the finals to CB Miraflores.

Kėdainiai Nevėžis
On 4 August 2017, Maldūnas signed with Nevėžis Kėdainiai of the Lithuanian Basketball League (LKL). The team finished in 8th place in 2017–18 LKL season and lost to BC Žalgiris in the first round of the playoffs. In 2018–19 LKL season the team finished in 9th place.

Lietkabelis Panevėžys
On 11 July 2019, Maldūnas signed with Lietkabelis Panevėžys of the Lithuanian Basketball League (LKL). The team finished in third place in 2019–20 LKL season and also won bronze medal in King Mindaugas Cup. The team also made it to the playoffs of the Basketball Champions League. On 7 July 2022, Maldūnas signed a two-year contract extension with the club.

Personal life
While at Dartmouth, Maldunas was a member of Beta Alpha Omega fraternity and Sphinx Senior Society.

References

External links

 Dartmouth Big Green bio
 RealGM profile
 

1993 births
Living people
BC Lietkabelis players
CB Peñas Huesca players
Centers (basketball)
Dartmouth Big Green men's basketball players
Lithuanian expatriate basketball people in Spain
Lithuanian expatriate basketball people in the United States
Lithuanian men's basketball players
Palencia Baloncesto players
Power forwards (basketball)
Sportspeople from Panevėžys